A Minor Revolution, or AMR, is an American punk rock and ska-punk band from Dover, New Hampshire, United States. It was formed by friends while attending the University of New Hampshire in 2007. They have recorded one album, one EP, a split EP with current record labelmates The Digs, and have appeared on two compilations from a small Pennsylvania record label and promotion company, Hateful Notebook. AMR has opened for such national touring acts as The Flatliners, The Atom Age, Badfish, Paranoid Social Club, Michale Graves, Mustard Plug, Mephiskapheles, The Slackers, The Planet Smashers, The Bruce Lee Band, and more. Over the years, the band has developed a following in eastern New England.

History
A Minor Revolution started when Zack Sprague and Pat Flood (drums and guitar, respectively) met while attending UNH in Durham, New Hampshire. They started jamming with Ryan Lovlien as a secondary guitar player, and Keith Patterson on bass. They were originally called The Pounding 40's until they started writing original music. Looking for a name that would be more serious, and reflect their message, they came up with A Minor Revolution, which they claim has numerous meanings. Patterson was replaced by their current bassist, A.J. Valcourt, in 2010. Occasionally, mutual friend and guitar tech Jameson Savage will fill in on bass.

Their first album, AMRica, was self-released in 2012. After recording the album once through, they were unhappy with the finished product. So they returned to the studio to re-record the entire album. At about this same time Flood left the band, but was not replaced by an additional guitar player. Instead, the band added tenor saxophone player Matt Smith. In 2012, an alto sax was added to the horn section by Christopher "Luthor" Miranda.

Their next recording endeavor was an EP entitled Consexual Sense, released in 2014 on an independent Boston record label, Ocelot Records. This CD reflected the band's change in musical direction to ska-punk. In June of that year, the band went on a tour of the Northeast to support the EP. Dylan Morrissette substituted for Sprague on drums for the duration of this tour.

Smith parted ways with the band shortly after this, and was replaced for a short time by Andrew Riordan. In 2014, band toured the West Coast to gain exposure out there. Later that year, they released a split EP with their label mates The Digs, called Worst Human Being on the Planet. Their contribution included a re-recording of an earlier song (now with horns), and one new song.

Members

Current members
 Ryan Lovlien (aka Ryan Revvolution) (guitar, lead vocals)
 A.J. Valcourt (bass, vocals)
 Zack Sprague (drums)
 Christopher Miranda (aka Luthor) (alto sax, tenor sax, vocals)

Past members
 Pat Flood (guitar, vocals)
 Keith Patterson (bass)
 Matt Smith (tenor sax)
 Jameson Savage (bass, vocals)
 Dylan Morrissette (drums)
 Andrew Riordan (tenor sax)

Discography

Studio recordings
The AMRica Demos 2012
Consexual Sense 2014, Ocelot
Worst Human Being on the Planet (split) 2014, Ocelot

Compilations
Punks for Tots Vol. 1 2013, Hateful Notebook Productions
Pizza Compilation 2014, Hateful Notebook Productions

References

External links
 Official website
 Page on Ocelot Records
 Bandcamp page

American punk rock groups
American pop punk groups
American ska punk musical groups
Musical groups established in 2007
Rock music groups from New Hampshire